Robert Pollock Bonthron (1880 – after 1911) was a Scottish professional footballer who played as a right-back for Manchester United, Sunderland and Birmingham in the Football League.

Bonthron was born in Burntisland, Fife. He played for Raith Rovers and Dundee before joining Manchester United in May 1903. He helped them to promotion to the First Division in the 1905–06 season and made a total of 134 appearances for the club in all competitions, scoring three goals. He was a combative player and during the promotion season was at the centre of a serious incident after Manchester United's match at Bradford City. His treatment of Bradford player Jimmy Conlin during the match enraged the crowd and after the game Bonthron was attacked by home supporters. Criminal charges followed against the perpetrators and a Football Association (FA) inquiry resulted in the temporary closure of Bradford City's Valley Parade ground.

He joined Sunderland in May 1907, playing 24 games, before moving on the following year to Northampton Town, with whom he won the Southern League championship in the 1908–09 season. He spent the 1910–11 season with Birmingham before returning to Scotland with Airdrieonians and Leith Athletic.

Personal life 
Bonthron served as a lance corporal in the Gordon Highlanders and the Labour Corps during the First World War.

Honours 
Raith Rovers

 Northern League: 1901–02

References

1880 births
Year of death missing
People from Burntisland
Scottish footballers
Association football fullbacks
Raith Rovers F.C. players
Dundee F.C. players
Manchester United F.C. players
Sunderland A.F.C. players
Northampton Town F.C. players
Birmingham City F.C. players
Airdrieonians F.C. (1878) players
Place of death missing
Leith Athletic F.C. players
Footballers from Fife
British Army personnel of World War I
Gordon Highlanders soldiers
Royal Pioneer Corps soldiers